Polyzosteria mitchelli, also known as Mitchell's diurnal cockroach or the Mardi Gras cockroach, is a species of bush cockroach found in Australia. It is a diurnal species and its typical habitat is semi-arid regions of Australia's warm temperate zone.

Description
Polyzosteria mitchelli is a wingless, dorsally-flattened insect. It is typically blue and yellow in colour, and thus is one of the most strikingly coloured Australian cockroaches. It is primarily found in semi-arid areas of Western Australia, South Australia and New South Wales.

P. mitchelli sprays a pungent defensive fluid from glands in its abdomen when disturbed.

References

External links

Cockroaches
Insects of Australia
Insects described in 1847